Supercrush are a Power Pop/Alternative Rock band formed in 2013. The band is fronted by Mark Palm, a former singer of the hardcore band Go It Alone. They signed to Don Giovanni Records in 2020.

Discography

Albums

EPs

References

External links
 Supercrush at Don Giovanni Records

Musical groups from Vancouver
Canadian indie pop groups
Canadian power pop groups
Musical groups established in 2013
Don Giovanni Records artists